Julie O'Callaghan (born 1954) is an American poet based in Ireland. She has written poetry for both children and adults.

Life
Born in Chicago, Julie O'Callaghan came to Ireland in July 1974 to study for a year at Trinity College Dublin. Abandoning her degree, she moved to Ireland permanently, taking a job in the Library of Trinity College. In 1985 she married the poet Dennis O'Driscoll, who died in 2012.

In 2021 her poem The Net was covered by the Irish Independent.

O'Callaghan received the Michael Hartnett Poetry Award in 2001, and is a member of the Aosdána.

Works
 Edible anecdotes and other poems. Mountrath, Portlaoise, Ireland: Dolmen Press, 1983.
 Well-heeled, London: Gefn Press, 1985. With lithographs by Susan Johanknecht.
 (with Alan Bold and Gareth Owen) Bright lights blaze out. Oxford: Oxford University Press, 1986.
 Taking my pen for a walk. London: Orchard, 1988.
 Jasper the Lion Heart. London: Gefn Press, 1990. With lithographs by Susan Johanknecht.
 What's what. Newcastle upon Tyne: Bloodaxe Books, 1991.
 Two barks: poems. Newcastle upon Tyne: Bloodaxe Books, 1998.
 No can do. Newcastle upon Tyne: Bloodaxe Books, 2000.
 Problem. Boston, MA: Pressed Wafer, 2005.
 The book of whispers. London: Faber, 2006.
 Tell me this is normal': new & selected poems. Tarset, Northumberland: Bloodaze Books, 2008.
 Magnum Mysterium. Bloodaxe Books, 2020.

References

1954 births
American emigrants to Ireland
American poets
American women poets
People from Chicago
Irish poets
Irish women poets
Children's poets
Living people